Belisarius (c. 500 – 565) was a military commander of the Byzantine Empire under the emperor Justinian I.

Belisarius may also refer to:
Belisarius (scorpion), genus of scorpions
Belisarius (play), 1724 tragedy by the British writer William Phillips
Belisarius (1781 ship), privateer ship of the United States
Belisarius Productions, production company 
Belisarius series, a series of alternate history books by Eric Fint and David Drake

See also
Belisarius (ship) for other ships with a similar spelling
Piotr Domaradzki, Polish-American journalist who edited in Wikipedia under the name Bellisarius
Velizar, Serbian and Bulgarian masculine given name